Provincial Road 308 (PR 308), is a provincial road in Manitoba, Canada.  It runs from the Trans-Canada Highway near East Braintree to Highway 12 at Sprague near the United States border, traveling through the largely unpopulated boreal forests in the far southeastern region of the province.  The road is unpaved from the Trans-Canada Highway to Moose Lake, the remainder of the road to Sprague is paved.

PR 308 provides access to Moose Lake Provincial Park and Northwest Angle, an exclave of the U.S. state of Minnesota, via PR 525.

References

External links
Official Manitoba Highway Map

308